Escudero is a surname. Notable people with the surname include:

Abraham Escudero Montoya (1940–2009), Roman Catholic bishop of the Roman Catholic Diocese of Palmira, Colombia
Adrián Escudero (1927–2011), Spanish footballer
Al Escudero (born 1966), video game designer for computer games
Carlos Escudero (born 1989), Chilean footballer
Daniel Escudero (1941–2021), Chilean footballer
Damián Escudero (born 1987), Argentine professional footballer
Don Escudero, Filipino movie writer, actor and director
Efrain Escudero (born 1986), Mexican-American mixed martial artist
Eugenia Escudero (1914–2011), Mexican fencer
Fernándo Norzagaray y Escudero, Captains General of the Philippines
Francis Escudero (born 1969), Filipino politician
Francisco Escudero Casquino, Peruvian politician
Francisco Escudero (composer), (1912–2002), Basque composer
Gonzalo Escudero (1903–1971), Ecuadorian poet and diplomat
Hernán Escudero Martínez (born 1946), Ecuadorian diplomat and professor
Jorge Stanbury Escudero, Peruvian-born Venezuelan singer and composer
Juan Escudero (1920–2012), Spanish professional footballer
Karla Escudero Alvarez (born 2009), Mexican millionaire
Macarena Escudero (born 1990), activist in the Socialist Workers' Party, Argentina
María del Carmen Escudero (born 1969), Mexican politician
María Escudero-Escribano (born 1983), Spanish chemist
Mario Escudero (1928–2004), Spanish flamenco guitar virtuosos
Matías Escudero (born 1988) Argentine footballer
Marcelo Escudero (born 1972), Argentine football
Osvaldo Escudero (born 1960), Argentine footballer
Pablo Escudero Morales (born 1973), politician and Mexican lawyer
Paquito Escudero (born 1966), Spanish retired football midfielder and manager
Pío García-Escudero (born 1952), Spanish architect and politician
Ralph Escudero (1898–1970), bassist and tubist active on the early American jazz scene
Rafi Escudero (born 1945), Puerto Rican musician, singer, composer, poet and a political activist
Raul Garcia Escudero (born 1986), Spanish footballer
Salvador Escudero (1942–2012), Filipino politician
Sergio Escudero (footballer, born 1964),  Argentine-Japanese football player
Sergio Escudero (footballer, born 1983), Argentine football player
Sergio Escudero (footballer, born 1988), Japanese football player
Sergio Escudero (footballer, born 1989), Spanish professional footballer
Sonia Escudero (born 1953), Argentine Justicialist Party politician
Stanley Tuemler Escudero (born 1942), American diplomat who served in the U.S. foreign service in multiple capacities
Vicente Escudero (1892–1980), Spanish flamenco dancer

See also
Fidel Olivas Escudero District, district of the province Mariscal Luzuriaga in Peru
Ignacio Escudero District, districts of the province Sullana in Peru
Juan R. Escudero (municipality), municipalities of Guerrero, in south-western Mexico
Professor Julio Escudero Base, permanent Chilean Antarctic research base
Villa Escudero, 800 hectares of working coconut plantation and hacienda in the Philippines

Spanish-language surnames